Neal Zaslaw (born  June 28, 1939) is an American musicologist.

Life and career
Born in New York, Zaslaw graduated from Harvard in 1961 with a BA and obtained his master's from Juilliard in 1963. He played flute in the American Symphony Orchestra under Leopold Stokowski from 1962 to 1965. In 1970 he received his Ph.D from Columbia University; he also taught at CUNY, 1968-70. Since 1970 he has taught at Cornell University.

Zaslaw's early work dealt with performance practice, especially tempo and ornamentation with respect to French and Italian styles. Zaslaw has done extended work on the works of Wolfgang Amadeus Mozart, including a landmark 1989 work on his symphonies. In 1993, he was named the principal editor of the revised Köchel catalogue.

Works
Zaslaw, Neal (1994) "Mozart as a working stiff," in James M. Morris, ed., On Mozart, Cambridge University Press.  An influential assertion of the practicality of Mozart's motivations in composition, attacking older conceptions as romanticized and unrealistic. Available on line:  .

Books
Materials for the Life and Works of Jean-Marie Leclair L’ainé (dissertation, Columbia U., 1970)
with M. Vinquist: Performance Practice: a Bibliography (New York, 1971)
(ed.) Man & Music:/Music in Society: The Classical Era (London, 1989)
Mozart’s Symphonies: Context, Performance Practice, Reception (Oxford, 1989)
The Compleat Mozart: a Guide to the Musical Works (New York, 1990)
(ed. with F.M. Fein) The Mozart Repertory: a Guide for Musicians, Programmers, and Researchers (Ithaca, NY, 1991)
(ed.) Mozart’s Piano Concertos: Text, Context, Interpretation (Ann Arbor, 1996)
with J. Spitzer: The birth of the orchestra: history of an institution, 1650 - 1815 (Oxford Univ. Press 2004)

Notable student

References
Paula Morgan. "Neal Zaslaw". The New Grove Dictionary of Music and Musicians online.
Liber amicorum
 Cliff Eisen (ed.): Coll' astuzia, col giudizio : essays in honor of Neal Zaslaw (Ann Arbor, Mich. : Steglein 2009) 

American musicologists
Cornell University faculty
Columbia University alumni
Harvard University alumni
Mozart scholars
Living people
1939 births